George Mathews (October 10, 1911 – November 7, 1984) was an American actor whose film career stretched from an uncredited appearance in Stage Door Canteen in 1943 to Going Home in 1971.

Biography

Mathews was born in Brooklyn, New York. His stage career began in the early 1930s, when he failed to get a job with the U.S. Postal Service. He joined the Federal Theatre Project and landed the role of Dynamite Jim in the 1937 Broadway revival of the play Processional.

Mathews was often cast as heavies or hardened military types. He appeared in both the stage (1942–43) and film version (1944) of The Eve of St. Mark, as Sergeant Ruby. He also portrayed a comedic thug in Pat and Mike (1952).

He appeared on Broadway in the Garson Kanin-directed musical comedy Do Re Mi (1960–62), as "Fatso O'Rear". He later appeared on Broadway play, Catch Me If You Can in 1965.

In 1962, he appeared in Have Gun – Will Travel, Season 6, Episode 6. That same year, he played ex-fighter, “Champ”,  in the Season 7 Episode 28 of Gunsmoke, “The Dealer”. He demonstrated his comedic talent in the short-lived television comedy series Glynis (1963), playing ex-cop Chick Rogers, who assists a mystery writer and amateur sleuth, played by Glynis Johns, in solving "whodunnits".

Perhaps his most memorable role was as the bully "Harvey" in 'The Bensonhurst Bomber' episode of The Honeymooners. He retired from the screen in 1972.

Personal life and death 
Mathews died from heart disease in Caesars Head, South Carolina, aged 73, in 1984. He was married to stage actress Mary (Haynsworth) Mathews from 1951 until his death in 1984.

Filmography

Selected Television

References

External links

1984 deaths
1911 births
20th-century American male actors
American male film actors
American male television actors
American male stage actors
Male actors from New York City